Rodney Neville Madgwick  is a former Australian judge who served as a judge of the Federal Court of Australia from 3 October 1995 to 21 April 2008. He was based in the Sydney registry of the court. He attended Sydney Boys High School from 1954-58. He was President of the Australian Society of Labor Lawyers and the New South Wales Society of Labor Lawyers in 1981.

References

Australian King's Counsel
Year of birth missing (living people)
Living people
Judges of the Federal Court of Australia
Judges of the Industrial Relations Court of Australia
20th-century Australian judges
21st-century Australian judges